The 22nd ceremony of the annual Goya Awards, took place at the Palacio de Congresos of the Campo de las Naciones in Madrid, Spain on February 3, 2008, presented by José Corbacho. On December 17, 2007, Juan Diego Botto and Ivana Baquero were responsible for reading the nominations on behalf of the Academy.

The surprise winner of the night was Solitary Fragments by Jaime Rosales who won the Goya for best film and best direction. Las 13 rosas started with 14 nominations and won four, while El Orfanato, which began as a favorite won 7 Goyas but not a major one.

Major awards

Other award nominees

Honorary Goya
 Alfredo Landa

References

22
2007 film awards
2007 in Spanish cinema
2008 in Madrid